Wu Di (a.k.a. Wuzhala; born 1951) is a film critic and historian based in Beijing. He is the author of the definitive history of the Cultural Revolution in the Chinese autonomous region of Inner Mongolia, as well as editor of a major collection of archival material documenting the development of the film medium in Mao Zedong's China.

Stir
Wu Di caused somewhat of a stir in Chinese academic circles in the winter of 2006–2007 when he published in the journal Contemporary Cinema (当代电影) a powerful critique of plagiarism and declining ethical standards in China's sectors of higher education and film research. In 2007, he founded the Academic Anti-Corruption Work Office, a non-profit organization that supports the exposure and "outing" of members of China's social science and humanities community practicing plagiarism.

In September 2008, together with He Shu, Wu Di launched the electronic journal Remembrance (记忆), currently the only PRC publication of its kind, devoted exclusively to publishing and promoting academic research on the Cultural Revolution.

References

内蒙文革实录："民族分裂”与“挖肃”运动 （Record of the Cultural Revolution in Inner Mongolia: "Ethnic Separatism" and the Movement to "Weed out Counterrevolutionaries"）， Hong Kong: Mirror Books, 2010. 
Pseud. "W. Woody", The Cultural Revolution in Inner Mongolia: Extracts from an Unpublished History. Stockholm: Center for Pacific Asia Studies, 1993. Occasional Paper No. 20. 
Wu Di (ed.), 中国电影研究资料1949－1979 (Research Documentation on Chinese Film 1949–1979), 3 vols. Beijing: Wenhua yishu chubanshe, 2006). .
Wu Di, 学术规范与职业道德 (Academic Norms and Professional Morals), orig. publ. in 《当代电影》, No. 6, 2006. 
学术反腐工作室成立公告 (Announcing the Foundation of the Academic Anti-Corruption Work Office), 25 July 2007. 
Review (in English) of journal Remembrance as edited by Wu Di and He Shu, see http://journals.cambridge.org/action/displayAbstract?aid=4910380

1951 births
People's Republic of China historians
Living people
Historians of Mongolia
Chinese film critics